Converse Hall is one of the oldest and central buildings on the campus of Westminster College in Salt Lake City, Utah, United States. It was listed on the National Register of Historic Places in 1978.

Description
The -story masonry structure was built out of red brick and white stone in the Jacobethan and Tudor Revival styles. It was the first building erected for the college in 1906, to a design by the Salt Lake City architectural firm of Erskine and Liljenberg, and is a regionally rare example of this unusual architectural style. The building suffered extensive damage in a fire early in the morning of 12 March 1926, but was rebuilt and re-opened in September of that year.

Gallery

See also

 National Register of Historic Places listings in Salt Lake City

References

External links

 Official website of Westminster College

School buildings on the National Register of Historic Places in Utah
National Register of Historic Places in Salt Lake City
Tudor Revival architecture in the United States
Buildings and structures completed in 1906
Buildings and structures in Salt Lake City
1906 establishments in Utah
Westminster College (Utah)